Geng Bingwen (1334–1403) was a Ming dynasty general. He participated in the Jingnan Campaign on the side of the Jianwen Emperor. He committed suicide.

References

1334 births
1403 deaths
Ming dynasty generals
People of the Jingnan Campaign
Suicides in the Ming dynasty
People from Fengyang